Tyrone is a ghost town in Westfield Township,  Morrow County, in the U.S. state of Ohio.

History
Tyrone was laid out in 1829.

References

Geography of Morrow County, Ohio
1829 establishments in Ohio
Populated places established in 1829
Ghost towns in Ohio